"You Got the Love" is a hit song for the funk band Rufus. It was written by Ray Parker Jr. and Chaka Khan. From the Rags to Rufus album, it spent one week at number one on the Hot Soul Singles chart in 1974. It also peaked at number 11 on the Billboard Hot 100 singles chart.

Chart positions

Other versions 
"You Got the Love" is the first track of 1983 live album Stompin' at the Savoy – Live.

Chaka Khan re-recorded "You Got the Love/Pack'd My Bags" medley for her 2007 album Funk This, with Tony Maiden on guitar.

References

1974 singles
Soul songs
Chaka Khan songs
Songs written by Ray Parker Jr.
Songs written by Chaka Khan
Maxine Nightingale songs
ABC Records singles
1974 songs